State Route 105 (SR 105) is a  state highway in the northeastern part of the U.S. state of Georgia. The highway begins at the Banks–Franklin–Stephens county tripoint, east-southeast of Baldwin. It ends at Harvest, which is west-northwest of Clarkesville.

The entire section concurrent with SR 385 travels along the historic route of U.S. Route 441 (US 441).

Route description
SR 105 begins at an intersection with SR 184 on the Banks–Franklin–Stephens county tripoint, on the southern edge of the Chattahoochee-Oconee National Forest. It enters the forest almost immediately. For just under , it travels on the Banks–Stephens county line. At its southern end, the highway is a winding road. It crosses over the Middle Fork Broad River and travels through rural areas of the county. It intersects US 441/SR 15. The three highways travel concurrently to the north-northwest. They curve to the northwest and leave the forest and enter Baldwin. They intersect a former segment of US 441 and then enter Habersham County. At an intersection with the southern terminus of US 441 Bus., SR 105 leaves US 441/SR 15 and begins to follow US 441 Bus. They travel to the northeast and then enter Cornelia. They curve to the north-northwest. At an intersection with the northern terminus of Wayside Street, the eastern terminus of Cleveland Road, and the southern terminus of Veterans Memorial Drive, US 441 Bus./SR 105 turns right onto Veterans Memorial Drive and travel to the northeast. They curve to the north-northwest and have an interchange with US 23/US 441/SR 365. At this interchange, SR 385 begins. At Cannon Bridge Road, SR 105 departs the concurrency and then leaves the city. It curves to the northwest and crosses over the Soque River. It curves to the west-northwest and intersects SR 115. It curves to the north-northeast and meets its northern terminus, an intersection with SR 17 in Harvest.

The only part of SR 105 that is part of the National Highway System, a system of roadways important to the nation's economy, defense, and mobility, is the portion concurrent with US 441/SR 115.

History

Major intersections

See also

References

External links

105
Transportation in Banks County, Georgia
Transportation in Habersham County, Georgia
U.S. Route 441
Chattahoochee-Oconee National Forest